The 2nd Open Russian Festival of Animated Films was held in 1997 at a boarding house called "Birch Grove" near the town of Tarusa, Russia.  Animated works from the past three years from the Russian Federation were accepted.

The prizes were handed out according to profession, and any member or guest of the festival was able to vote for their favourite film.

Despite the growing economic crisis in the country, it marked an artistic high point in the Russian animation field in the 1990s, and the high quality of the films attracted the attention of the national mainstream media.

Jury

Prizes of the Jury

Rating (by audience vote)

References

External links
Full list of submissions (some can be watched online)
Official website with the results

Open Russian Festival of Animated Film
Anim
1997 in animation
Russ
Russ
Russ